Thomas Scott Eaton (born August 20, 1944 in Salem, Oregon) is a former American football defensive back in the National Football League. He was drafted by the New York Giants in the eight round of the 1967 NFL Draft. He played college football at Oregon State.

Eaton's son, Tracey, played six years in the NFL.

References

1944 births
Living people
American football cornerbacks
American football safeties
Oregon State Beavers football players
Oregon State Beavers men's basketball players
New York Giants players
Sportspeople from Salem, Oregon
Players of American football from Oregon
American men's basketball players